The Bài (牌) was an imperial Vietnamese decoration for merit. The decoration, an oblong shield of gold set with ten rubies was worn on a cord around the neck. It was given to meritorious princes, mandarins, generals, ministers and the highest civil servants.

The decoration is very old but was reformed by the emperor Thành Thái in 1889. It ceased to exist after the fall of the Vietnamese monarchy in 1945.

Gallery

Emperors with the Bai

External links  

 Overview of Annamese orders, decorations, and medals. 

 
 

Orders, decorations, and medals of Vietnam